Acompsosaurus is an extinct genus of aetosaur. It is known from a partial skeleton found from the Petrified Forest Member of the Chinle Formation near Fort Wingate, New Mexico, which is now lost. The generic name means "sturdy lizard." It may be a junior synonym of Stagonolepis as its pelvis closely resembles that of S. robertsoni.

References

Aetosaurs of North America
Prehistoric pseudosuchian genera